William Daniel D.D. was an Irish clergyman who served as the Church of Ireland Archbishop of Tuam from 1609 until his death in 1628.

Born in Kilkenny, he was one of the first appointed Scholars of Trinity College Dublin, and afterwards one of the college's first elected Fellows. While at Trinity College, he took up the work of translating The New Testament (Tiomna Nuadh) into Irish. This work was commenced by Nicholas Walsh (Bishop of Ossory), John Kearney (Treasurer of St Patrick's, Dublin), and Nehemiah Donnellan (Archbishop of Tuam), and was printed in 1602. William Daniel also translated an Irish version of the Book of Common Prayer, which was published in 1608.

He was appointed Prebendary of Stagonil in St Patrick's Cathedral, Dublin in 1591, and Treasurer of the cathedral in 1609. He was nominated Archbishop of Tuam on 28 June and consecrated in August 1609. After he became archbishop, he continued to hold the treasurership in commendam. The Archbishop died at Tuam on 11 July 1628, and was buried in the same tomb with his predecessor Nehemiah Donnellan in St Mary's Cathedral, Tuam.

See also

Bible translations by language

Further reading
 Ó hAodha, Ruairí. '"I followed it to the Presse with ielousy" Dr. Daniel of Tuam and the emergence of Gaelic print culture, c. 1570-1628' Journal of the Galway Archaeological and Historical Society vol. 65 (2013): pp. 7–27
 Williams, Nicholas. I bprionta i leabhar: na Protastúin agus prós na Gaeilge (Baile Átha Cliath, 1986)

References

1628 deaths
Alumni of Trinity College Dublin
Anglican archbishops of Tuam
Fellows of Trinity College Dublin
Christian clergy from County Galway
People from County Kilkenny
People of Elizabethan Ireland
Scholars of Trinity College Dublin
16th-century Irish Anglican priests
17th-century Anglican archbishops
17th-century Anglican bishops in Ireland
Year of birth unknown
Irish Anglican archbishops